is a Japanese footballer who plays as a midfielder for Kamatamare Sanuki in J3 League from 2023. He has previously played for both Nagoya Grampus and Gamba Osaka.

Career

Nagoya Grampus
Mori made his official debut for Nagoya Grampus in the J. League Division 1, J. League Cup on 19 March 2014 against Ventforet Kofu in Mizuho Athletic Stadium in Nagoya, Japan. He started the match and was subbed out in the 67th minute replaced by Ryota Aoki. Mori and his club lost the match 1-0.

Club career statistics

Updated 2 December 2018.

Reserves performance

References

External links 

 

1995 births
Living people
People from Anjō
Association football people from Aichi Prefecture
Japanese footballers
J1 League players
J3 League players
Nagoya Grampus players
J.League U-22 Selection players
Gamba Osaka players
Gamba Osaka U-23 players
Mito HollyHock players
Association football midfielders